The following is a list of awards and nominations received by American actress, screenwriter, film director and producer, Drew Barrymore.

Awards and nominations

Alliance of Women Film Journalists Awards

American Comedy Awards

Blockbuster Entertainment Awards

British Academy Film Awards

DVD Exclusive Awards

Dorian Awards

Elle Women in Hollywood Awards

Emmy Awards

GLAAD Media Awards

Golden Apple Awards

Golden Globe Awards

Golden Raspberry Awards

Gracie Awards

Guinness World Record

Hasty Pudding Theatricals Awards

Hollywood Film Festival Awards

Hollywood Makeup Artist and Hair Stylist Guild Awards

Hollywood Walk of Fame Awards

Irish Film & Television Academy Awards

Kids' Choice Awards

MTV Movie Awards

MystFest Awards

National Association of Theatre Owners Awards

Online Film & Television Association Awards

People's Choice Awards

PRISM Awards

Satellite Awards

Saturn Awards

Screen Actors Guild Awards

Stockholm Film Festival Awards

Teen Choice Awards

Utah Film Critics Association Awards

Women's Image Network Awards

Young Artist Awards

Notes

References

External links
 
 

Barrymore, Drew
Awards